Goryachiye Ruchyi was a rural locality (an inhabited locality) in the administrative jurisdiction of the Closed Administrative-Territorial Formation of Alexandrovsk in Murmansk Oblast, Russia, located beyond the Arctic Circle at a height of  above sea level. Due to depopulation, it was abolished effective December 1, 2009.

References

Notes

Sources

Abolished inhabited localities in Murmansk Oblast